Adapt or Die: Ten Years of Remixes is a remix album released by Everything but the Girl in 2005. It peaked at #9 in the Billboard Top Dance/Electronic Albums chart.

Track listing

Charts

References

Everything but the Girl compilation albums
2005 remix albums
Atlantic Records remix albums
Virgin Records remix albums